Cengiz Biçer (born 11 December 1987) is a Liechtenstein international footballer of Turkish descent, who currently plays for FC Balzers as a goalkeeper.

Career
After a year with USV Eschen/Mauren, where he had played in his youth, Biçer moved onto the Turkish side Samsunspor. In 2010, Biçer moved onto Mersin İdmanyurdu on a transfer. His debut in the Turkish Top Division was 30 March 2012 in the game versus Karabükspor.

International career
He is a member of the Liechtenstein national football team, but only has been capped 11 times as he remains behind long-time number one goalkeeper Peter Jehle. Biçer was capped six times for the Liechtenstein national under-21 football team in 2007 and 2008.

References

External links
 
 
 

1987 births
Living people
Sportspeople from the canton of St. Gallen
Liechtenstein footballers
Liechtenstein international footballers
Liechtenstein under-21 international footballers
Liechtenstein people of Turkish descent
Swiss men's footballers
Swiss people of Turkish descent
Swiss emigrants to Liechtenstein
Samsunspor footballers
Süper Lig players
Mersin İdman Yurdu footballers
Association football goalkeepers